Craig Crossman is a national newspaper columnist for McClatchy newspapers, specializing in computer-related articles. Throughout the years his articles have appeared in hundreds of newspapers including The Washington Post, The Boston Globe, The Orange County Register, The Hawaiian Advertiser, The San Jose Mercury News and The Press-Enterprise. He attended Florida Atlantic University.

He created and hosts the programme  Computer America, the longest running, nationally syndicated radio talk show about computers.

References

External links
Computer America
Craig Crossman's Computer America Not Just For Techies (1994 Boca Raton News article)

Year of birth missing (living people)
Living people
American talk radio hosts